South Korean musician IU has released more than 40 music videos since her debut in 2008, creating works for songs she has released as singles, as well as songs from her albums.

In addition to her music videos, she has released 14 special clips made of live performances of the songs.

Music videos

As lead artist

As featured artist

Special clips

References

Videographies of South Korean artists
Videography